

Results

Division One

Eastern Division

Final league table

Scottish War Emergency Cup

References

AFC Heritage Trust

Aberdeen F.C. seasons
Aber